Mexico competed at the 1956 Summer Olympics in Melbourne, Australia. 24 competitors, 21 men and 3 women, took part in 20 events in 10 sports.

Medalists

Athletics

Men
Track & road events

Cycling

Road

Diving

Fencing

Men

Women

Modern pentathlon

Three male pentathletes represented Mexico in 1956.

Individual
 José Pérez
 Antonio Almada
 David Romero

Team
 José Pérez
 Antonio Almada
 David Romero

Rowing

Shooting

Swimming

Men

Women

Weightlifting

Wrestling

Wrestlers who accumulated 5 "bad points" were eliminated. Points were given as follows: 1 point for victories short of a fall and 3 points for every loss.

References

External links
Official Olympic Reports
International Olympic Committee results database

Nations at the 1956 Summer Olympics
1956
1956 in Mexican sports